The  is a limited express train service operated by Central Japan Railway Company (JR Central) along the Takayama Main Line in central Japan since 1958, which connects  and  in just over 2 hours,  and  in 4 hours 15 minutes and  and  in 4 hours. Like all JR Central limited express trains, a limited express fee has to be paid, on top of the normal fare to ride this service.

Overview

Stations

Stations in brackets are stations where not all Hida services stop at.

 – –  – –  – – –  – – – – 

Some services continue to Toyama:  –  –  – – 

Ōsaka service:  –  –  –  –  –  –  (Couple with service from Nagoya) -  –  –  –  –  –  -  –  – 

Facilities

Accommodation
Standard class (including reserved seats and non-reserved seats) and Green class is available on this service, although not all services carry a Green car. Seat reservations can be made for an extra fee.  Both standard and Green classes feature comfortable seats, with the Green classes consisting of two types.  All standard class and Green classes in the middle of the train have 2+2 seat formations, while such Green class are more comfortable yet expensive than standard class. Another type of Green class are located at the front or the end of the car, featuring an even more comfortable 2+1 seat formation, with a panorama view through the driver’s cab.  Some panorama seats are cheaper as they are standard reserved or even non-reserved seats.

Utilities
There are one or more universal access toilets, as well as normal toilets, depending on how many carriages are being used for the service. There are also wheelchair spaces. Onboard catering services ceased on 16 March 2013. There is a vending machine onboard, which provides a small selection of drinks. Complimentary WiFi is also available.

Scenery
The service is known for its window that wraps around the cockpit offering un-interrupted views of the tracks in front of or behind the train; hence, a longer name for this service is Wide View Hida as is the case for other JR Central limited express services. Passengers who wish to take a panorama seat will have to pay an additional fare above basic fare and limited express fare (whether it is standard reserved/non-reserved or Green class) and require the seat specifically.

History

The service began on 1 March 1958.

After Typhoon Tokage in 2004, the track suffered major damage from flooding. As a result, instead of going all the way to Toyama Station, trains could only go as far as Hida-Furukawa Station until 8 September 2007, when the track was repaired and again reached all the way to Toyama Station.

Rolling stock

Current rolling stock
HC85 series diesel-electric multiple unit (DEMU) hybrid trains were used on Hida services from 1 July 2022. Since JR Central's 18 March 2023 timetable revision, all Hida services have been operated using HC85 series trains.

Past rolling stock
KiHa 80 series DMUs were used from the start of operation in 1958 until 1990. 

KiHa 85 series trains were used from 1989 until 2023, usually operating as 3-, 4-, 6-, 7-, or 8-car formations, or occasionally 10-car formations, especially during busy seasons.

References 

Central Japan Railway Company
Named passenger trains of Japan
Railway services introduced in 1958
1958 establishments in Japan